Thomas Juel-Nielsen (born 18 June 1990) is a Danish footballer who plays as a centre back.

Club career
In August 2013, Juel-Nielsen signed for Sandefjord Fotball until the end of the 2013 season. In 2016, he moved to Falkenbergs FF.

In June 2017, after a brief stint at AGF, Juel-Nielsen signed for Maccabi Netanya in the Israeli Premier League. The following month, however, he left the club.

On 14 February 2018, Juel-Nielsen signed with the Orange County SC of the United Soccer League. On 1 March 2019, Juel-Nielsen moved back to Denmark, signing for SønderjyskE. He left at the end of the season.

On 24 October 2019, Juel-Nielsen signed a one-year contract with a one-year extension option with Liga I club Gaz Metan Mediaș.

International career
Juel-Nielsen is a Danish youth international, having represented the Denmark U17 team 7 times, scoring twice, between 2006 and 2007.

Career statistics

Club

Honours
Sandefjord
 1. divisjon (1): 2014

References

External links
 

1990 births
Living people
Danish men's footballers
Denmark youth international footballers
Hvidovre IF players
Akademisk Boldklub players
Sandefjord Fotball players
Falkenbergs FF players
CS Gaz Metan Mediaș players
Aarhus Gymnastikforening players
Maccabi Netanya F.C. players
Orange County SC players
SønderjyskE Fodbold players
Danish expatriate men's footballers
Expatriate footballers in Norway
Expatriate footballers in Sweden
Expatriate footballers in Israel
Expatriate footballers in Romania
Expatriate soccer players in the United States
Danish expatriate sportspeople in Norway
Danish expatriate sportspeople in Sweden
Danish expatriate sportspeople in Israel
Danish expatriate sportspeople in Romania
Eliteserien players
Norwegian First Division players
Danish Superliga players
Danish 1st Division players
Allsvenskan players
Israeli Premier League players
Liga I players
Association football defenders